Dedicated may refer to:

Music
 Dedicated, a British record label whose artists included Spiritualized

Albums 
 Dedicated (ATB album), 2002
 Dedicated (Renée Geyer album), 2007
 Dedicated (Carly Rae Jepsen album), 2019
 Dedicated (Lemar album), 2003
 Dedicated (Murphy's Law album), 1996
 Dedicated (The Marshall Tucker Band album), 1981
 Dedicated '88–'91, a 2000 album by Upper Hutt Posse
 Dedicated, an album by Barry White 1983 
 Dedicated, an album by Ralph Bowen 2009
 Dedicated, an album by Wilson Phillips 2012
Dedicated Lemar (born 1978), 2004
Dedicated: A Salute to the 5 Royales Steve Cropper, 2011
Dedicated Kendrick Lamar (born 1987), 2013
Dedicated Murphy's law, 1996
Dedicated Evil Activities, 2003
Dedicated Seven (band), 2002
Dedicated, Vol. 1 Antônio Carlos Jobim 1998
Dedicated, Vol. 2 Antônio Carlos Jobim 1998
Dedicated Tyrone Jackson, 2005
Dedicated The Cockman Family, a bluegrass/Gospel band from Sherrills Ford, North Carolina, United States
Dedicated  2005
Dedicated  2003
Dedicated (Barry White album)

Songs
 "Dedicated", a song by Linkin Park from Songs from the Underground
 "Dedicated", a song by Parkway Drive from Ire
 "Dedicated" (song), a 1992 song by R. Kelly and Public Announcement from Born into the 90's
 "Dedicated", by Mariah Carey featuring Nas from Me. I Am Mariah... The Elusive Chanteuse
"Dedicated", by Funkdoobiest Composed by Brett Bouldin, Junior Vasquez, Muggs 1995
"Dedicated", by DJ Drama Lil Wayne
"Dedicated", by Lupe Fiasco
"Dedicated", by The Shirelles
"Dedicated", by Paul Carrack Composed by Paul Carrack
"Dedicated", by ATB Composed by André Tanneberger
"Dedicated", by Digable Planets Composed by Ishmael Butler
"Dedicated", by Delta Saxophone Quartet
"Dedicated", by Das EFX Composed by Andre "Krazy Drazyz" Weston, Klark Kent, Willie Hines
"Dedicated", by Lemar
"Dedicated", by Heavy D & the Boyz
"Dedicated", by Art Pepper
"Dedicated", by MF Doom, MF Grimm Composed by Percy Carey
"Dedicated", by Cornershop Composed by Tjinder Singh
"Dedicated", by Minimal Compact
"Dedicated", by DJ Screw
"Dedicated", by Heather B., Tammy Lucas, Pete Rock
"Dedicated", by Agerman, French Braids, Keak da Sneak
"Dedicated", by Keak da Sneak
"Dedicated", by Boss Hog Composed by Boss Hog
"Dedicated", by A-Trak, Nick Catchdubs, Freeway

See also 
 
 Dedication (disambiguation)